Tord Johnsen Salte (born 8 February 1999) is a Norwegian footballer who plays as a defender for Arendal.

Club career
On 2 February 2018, Salte joined Viking FK on loan from Olympique Lyonnais until the summer. On 25 June 2018, he joined the club permanently, signing a three-year contract. In February 2020, he joined Sandnes Ulf on a season-long loan. On 4 June 2021, he was loaned out for a second time, this time to Sogndal. On 28 July 2021, he joined Sogndal permanently on a contract until the end of the year. In March 2022, he signed a contract with Arendal.

International career
Salte has represented Norway from under-15 to under-21 level, making a total of 47 international appearances between 2014 and 2019.

Career statistics

Honours
Viking
 Norwegian First Division: 2018
 Norwegian Football Cup: 2019

References

1999 births
Living people
People from Time, Norway
Norwegian footballers
Norway youth international footballers
Norway under-21 international footballers
Norwegian expatriate footballers
Expatriate footballers in France
Norwegian expatriate sportspeople in France
Viking FK players
Sandnes Ulf players
Sogndal Fotball players
Arendal Fotball players
Norwegian First Division players
Eliteserien players
Association football defenders
Sportspeople from Rogaland